English singer-songwriter James Bay has released three studio albums, three extended plays, nineteen singles and twenty two music videos.

Albums

Extended plays

Singles

As lead artist

As featured artist

Other charted and certified songs

Songwriting and other appearances

Music videos

Notes

References

Discographies of British artists
Pop music discographies
Rock music discographies